Angelo Barozzi o Barocci (...-1237) was a Roman Catholic prelate. He was first priest of San Giovanni Elemosinario, then chaplain of St Mark's Basilica and ducal Chancellor. In August 1207 he was appointed patriarch of Grado.

Notes

Sources

External links 

 

Patriarchs of Aquileia
13th-century Roman Catholic archbishops
13th-century Venetian people
1237 deaths
Angelo